The 2015–16 season was the 133rd season in Bristol Rovers' history and their 88th in the Football League. Rovers returned to the Football League after an absence of just one season following their promotion from the Conference Premier via the play-offs.

For the second successive season, Rovers were promoted, the first time the club had achieved back to back promotions in its history. On a dramatic final day of the season in which Rovers required a win and other results to go in their favour, a 92nd-minute winner against Dagenham & Redbridge from Lee Brown sparked wild celebrations at the Memorial Stadium as the club returned to the third tier of English football for the first time in five years. Striker Matty Taylor ended the season as the top goalscorer in the top four divisions of the English football league system with 27 goals.

Season events

Pre-season

June
  – Popular midfielder Stuart Sinclair signed a new contract with Rovers.
  – Former Woking defender James Clarke joined Rovers on a one-year deal.
  – Full back Daniel Leadbitter signed a contract extension with Rovers, while wingers Andy Monkhouse and Abdulai Bell-Baggie left the club.
  – Gibraltar international Jake Gosling agreed a contract extension with Rovers. Academy players Ryan Broom, Tyler Lyttle, Jay Malpas and Kieran Preston signed professional contracts.
  – Ángelo Balanta rejected a new short-term deal with Rovers and left the club.
  – Chris Lines agreed a permanent transfer from Port Vale. Lines had previously played for Rovers, his boyhood club, between 2002–11 and on loan the previous season.

July
  – Former West Ham United winger Cristian Montaño signed for Rovers. Goalkeeper Will Puddy agreed a contract extension. Defender Neal Trotman rejected the opportunity to return to Rovers for pre-season and was therefore released.
  – Youngsters Jamie Lucas and Danny Greenslade agreed contract extensions.
  – Manager Darrell Clarke agreed a new contract with Rovers.
  – Billy Bodin signed a short-term deal with Rovers.

August
  – Winger Jeffrey Monakana signed on a month-long loan from Brighton & Hove Albion.
  – Jamie Lucas joins Boreham Wood on a month-long loan.
  – Rovers were eliminated from the League Cup first round, losing 2–1 to Championship side Birmingham City.
  – Chesterfield goalkeeper Aaron Chapman joined Rovers on a month-long loan. Rovers midfielder Ryan Broom joined Taunton Town on loan for one month.
  – Young midfielder Dominic Thomas joined Paulton Rovers on a month-long loan.
  – Striker Nathan Blissett joined National League side Tranmere Rovers on loan for one month.

September
  – Defender Adam Drury joined Rovers on a non-contract basis.
  – Adam Drury left Rovers just six days after joining, with the club citing "personal reasons".
  – Wigan Athletic goalkeeper Lee Nicholls joined Rovers on a three-month loan deal.
  – Colin Sexstone joined Rovers as a non-executive director. Sexstone had previously been a director at Gloucestershire CCC, Bristol City and Plymouth Argyle.

November
  – Rovers suffered a humiliating defeat in the first round proper of the FA Cup, losing 1–0 at home to Chesham United of the Southern League Premier.
  – Rovers are knocked out of their final cup competition, losing 1–0 away to League One side Southend United in the Football League Trophy.
  – Millwall forward Paris Cowan-Hall joined Rovers on a month-long loan. Winger Billy Bodin agreed a contract extension to the end of the season.
  – Rovers sign Cambridge United forward Rory Gaffney on loan until January while Nathan Blissett left for Lincoln City, also on loan with a view to becoming dead.

December
  – Rovers striker Matty Taylor was named PFA Fans' Player of the Month for November.

January
  – Nathan Blissett left Rovers by mutual consent.
  – Experienced midfielder Liam Lawrence joined Rovers from League One side Shrewsbury Town on a contract to the end of the season.
  – Rory Gaffney returned to the club from Cambridge United after his successful loan spell, joining on a permanent contract for an undisclosed fee.
  – Defender Tom Lockyer was awarded The Football League Young Player of the Month for December.
  – Forward Ellis Harrison joined Hartlepool United on a monthlong loan.
  – Experienced forward Rory Fallon joined Rovers on non-contract terms.

February
  – Rovers were acquired by the Jordanian Al-Qadi family, founders of the Arab Jordan Investment Bank, taking a 92% shareholding in the club. As part of the deal, Wael al-Qadi became President of the club while former Swansea City chairman Steve Hamer took up the same role with Rovers. Existing chairman Nick Higgs along with board members Barry Bradshaw, Chris Jelf, Colin Sexstone and Ed Ware all stood down from the board of directors with all expect Sexstone becoming Life Vice Presidents.

March
  – Swansea City forward Oli McBurnie joined Rovers on loan until the end of the season.

April
  – Rovers manager Darrell Clarke was awarded League Two Manager of the Month for March. Clarke had led the side to six wins out of seven during the month. Striker Matty Taylor won League Two Player of the Month for March. Taylor scored eight goals in the month's seven games including a hat-trick against Hartlepool United.
  – Lee Brown signed a contract extension at Rovers which will take him into a sixth season at the club.
  – Wales under-21 international Tom Lockyer extended his contract with Rovers. DriBuild were confirmed as next season's home shirt sponsors with Powersystems UK sponsoring the away shirt.

May
  – On the final day of the season, Rovers beat Dagenham & Redbridge 2–1 to secure promotion to League One.

First team

Transfers

In

Loans in

Out

Loans out

Squad statistics

Appearances, goals and cards

Goal scorers

Penalties

Disciplinary record

Competitions

Summary

Note: Games which are level after extra-time and are decided by a penalty shoot-out are listed as draws. Bristol Rovers score listed first where applicable.

Overall

League Two

League table

Results summary

Results by round

Scores overview
Bristol Rovers score given first.

Matches

Pre-season friendlies
On 26 May 2015, Rovers announced their initial pre-season fixtures against Salisbury, Cirencester Town, Arsenal U21s and Reading in addition to a testimonial fixture against West Bromwich Albion for long serving, retiring physiotherapist and former player Phil Kite. Further friendlies against Cheltenham Town, Mangotsfield United and Sutton United were later added, all away from home.

League Two
On 17 June 2015, the Football League revealed the fixtures for the forthcoming season. Rovers' first fixture was against Northampton Town at the Memorial Stadium followed, a week later by a trip to Huish Park to face Yeovil Town. The traditional boxing day fixture saw Rovers' travel to AFC Wimbledon while the final game of the season saw Dagenham & Redbridge visit the Mem.

August

September

October

November

December

January

February

March

April

May

FA Cup
On 26 October 2015, the first round draw was made. Rovers were drawn at home to Southern League Premier side Chesham United whom they lost to 1–0.

Football League Cup
On 16 June 2015, the first round draw was made, Rovers were drawn at home against Championship side Birmingham City, who they lost to 2–1.

Football League Trophy
On 3 August 2015, Rovers were awarded a bye in the first round. On 5 September 2015, Rovers were drawn at home against fellow League Two side Wycombe Wanderers, whom they defeated 2–0. On 10 October 2015, Rovers were drawn away to League One side Southend United in the quarter-final and were defeated 1–0.

Gloucestershire Senior Cup
Rovers' entered in the first round of the Gloucestershire Senior Cup where they faced holders Cirencester Town, whom they defeated 5–2. They then met Mangotsfield United in the quarter-final, winning 4–1. Their semi-final was against Forest Green Rovers whom they lost to 4–3. Rovers generally fielded a team of non-regular first-team and youth squad players in the competition.

See also
2015–16 in English football
2015–16 Football League Two
List of Bristol Rovers F.C. seasons

References

External links
 Bristol Rovers F.C.
 Bristol Post
 BBC Sport
 Sky Sports
 Soccerbase: ResultsStatsTransfers

Bristol Rovers
Bristol Rovers F.C. seasons